The Duchy of Nassau and the United States' mutual recognition occurred in 1846 when the two states signed a convention to abolish emigration taxes. During the Austro-Prussian War, the Duchy of Nassau fought on the side of Austria. On the losing side, the Duchy of Nassau was annexed to Prussia on October 3, 1866, ceased to be an independent sovereign state ending relations.

History
On May 27, 1846, the signing of a Convention for the Mutual Abolition of the Droit d’Aubaine and Taxes on Emigration began mutual recognition between both countries. This convention was concluded in Berlin between U.S. Minister to Prussia Henry Wheaton and Nassau’s Minister to Prussia Col. and Chamberlain Otto Wilhelm Carl von Roeder.

The first U.S. Consul appointed to the Duchy of Nassau was John B. Muller Melchiors on November 1, 1853.

In 1866 relations ended after the Prussian-Austrian war which resulted in Austria's defeat and Nassau was annexed by Prussia on October 3 ending the existence of the Duchy.

See also

 Foreign relations of the United States
 Germany–United States relations
 Grand Duchy of Baden–United States relations
 Kingdom of Bavaria–United States relations
 Duchy of Brunswick-Lüneburg–United States relations
 Kingdom of Hanover–United States relations
 German Empire–United States relations
 Hanseatic Republics–United States relations
 Grand Duchy of Hesse–United States relations
 Grand Duchy of Mecklenburg-Schwerin–United States relations
 Grand Duchy of Mecklenburg-Strelitz–United States relations
 North German Confederation–United States relations
 Grand Duchy of Oldenburg–United States relations
 Principality of Schaumburg-Lippe–United States relations
 Kingdom of Württemberg–United States relations

References

United States
Bilateral relations of the United States
Germany–United States relations